Rissoina spirata , common name the spiral risso, is a species of minute sea snail, a marine gastropod mollusk or micromollusk in the family Rissoinidae.

Description
The size of the shell varies between 7 mm and 15 mm.

Distribution
This species occurs in the Red Sea, in the Indian Ocean off Madagascar and the Aldabra Atoll; in the Central Pacific; in the Mediterranean Sea.

References

 Dautzenberg, Ph. (1929). Contribution à l'étude de la faune de Madagascar: Mollusca marina testacea. Faune des colonies françaises, III(fasc. 4). Société d'Editions géographiques, maritimes et coloniales: Paris. 321-636, plates IV-VII pp.
 Taylor, J.D. (1973). Provisional list of the mollusca of Aldabra Atoll.
 Streftaris, N.; Zenetos, A.; Papathanassiou, E. (2005). Globalisation in marine ecosystems: the story of non-indigenous marine species across European seas. Oceanogr. Mar. Biol. Annu. Rev. 43: 419-453

External links

Rissoinidae
Gastropods described in 1820